David Hay (born 1948) is a Scottish football player and manager.

David Hay may also refer to:

David de la Hay (c. 1318–1346), Lord High Constable of Scotland
David Hay (cardiologist) (1927–2016), New Zealand cardiologist and anti-smoking campaigner
David Hay (curler) (born 1962), Scottish curler
David Hay (diplomat) (1916–2009), Australian diplomat and public servant
David Hay (engineer) (1859–1938), British civil engineer
David Hay (Australian politician) (born 1933), member of the New South Wales Legislative Assembly 
David Hay (Auckland politician)
David Davidson Hay (1828–1908), Ontario political figure
David Hay (artist) (1798–1866), Scottish decorator and colour theorist
David Hay (nurseryman) (1815–1883), New Zealand nurseryman

See also
David Haye (born 1980), British boxer
David Hays (disambiguation)
David Hey (1938–2016), English historian 
David Hayes (disambiguation)